is a national highway of Japan that traverses the prefecture of Fukushima in a northwest–southeast routing. It connects the prefecture's capital city, Fukushima in north-central Fukushima Prefecture to the town of Namie on the prefecture's eastern coast. A section of the highway was closed following the Fukushima Daiichi nuclear disaster, but it has since been reopened.

Route description
National Route 114 begins at a junction with National Route 4 and National Route 115 in the Fukushima Prefecture's capital city, Fukushima in the north-central part of the prefecture. Heading east through the town of Kawamata, the route crosses over the Abukuma Highlands that divide the prefecture's central Nakadōri and eastern Hamadōri regions. Crossing into the town of Namie, the highway meets National Route 399 and shares a brief concurrency with it before National Route 399 departs to the south at junction with National Route 459. National Route 459 joins National Route 114 as a concurrent route towards central Namie. Just west of central Namie the highway meets the Jōban Expressway at Namie Interchange. In the central district of Namie, the two concurrent highways end at a junction with National Route 6.

History
National Route 114 was established by the Cabinet of Japan on 18 May 1954 as Secondary National Route 114 between the city of Fukushima and the town of Namie. The highway was reclassified as General National Route 114 on 1 April 1965. A straightening and widening project, called the Kotsunagi Bypass, began along the highway in the mountains of Kawamata in 2006. After nine years of construction, the project was completed on 28 June 2015.

Closure within the nuclear exclusion zone

A section of the highway was closed between its eastern terminus and the Shimotsushima neighborhood of Namie following the Fukushima Daiichi nuclear disaster and the subsequent establishment of the 20 kilometer exclusion zone on 22 April 2011. On 6 December 2014, the highway was reopened to vehicular traffic east of the Jōban Expressway in order to allow traffic from the new section of expressway to be linked to National Route 6 and the rest of the expressway further south. From then until 2017, a  section of highway remained closed within the exclusion zone. The interchange with the Jōban Expressway was expanded on 1 March 2015 to allow access to the expressway's newly-built section between Namie and Tomioka. National Route 114 was fully reopened to vehicular traffic on 20 September 2017, though some restrictions are still in place in terms of where the highway can be exited.

Major junctions
The route lies entirely within Fukushima Prefecture.

See also

References

External links

114
Roads in Fukushima Prefecture